The 1975–76 Scottish Inter-District Championship was a rugby union competition for Scotland's district teams.

This season saw the 23rd Scottish Inter-District Championship.

South, Glasgow District and Edinburgh District shared the competition with 2 wins and 1 loss.

1975-76 League Table

Results

Round 1

South: 

North and Midlands:

Matches outwith the Championship

Other Scottish matches

Trial matches

Blues: 

Whites:

English matches

International matches

References

1975–76 in Scottish rugby union
Scottish Inter-District Championship seasons